Ariel Osvaldo Pestano Valdés (born January 31, 1974), better known as El Veterano ("The Veteran"), is a Cuban baseball catcher, and is known as one of the greatest catchers in Cuban history. He has won both silver and gold medals in the Olympic Games and also played catcher on Cuba's World Baseball Classic team in March 2006 and March 2009. In Cuba, Pestano plays with the Villa Clara Naranjas of the Cuban National Series.

Personal life
Pestano was born in Caibarien, Cuba.

References

External links
 

1974 births
Living people
Olympic baseball players of Cuba
Olympic gold medalists for Cuba
Olympic silver medalists for Cuba
Olympic medalists in baseball
Medalists at the 2000 Summer Olympics
Medalists at the 2004 Summer Olympics
Medalists at the 2008 Summer Olympics
Baseball players at the 2000 Summer Olympics
Baseball players at the 2004 Summer Olympics
Baseball players at the 2008 Summer Olympics
Pan American Games gold medalists for Cuba
Pan American Games bronze medalists for Cuba
Baseball players at the 1999 Pan American Games
Baseball players at the 2003 Pan American Games
Baseball players at the 2007 Pan American Games
Baseball players at the 2011 Pan American Games
2006 World Baseball Classic players
2009 World Baseball Classic players
Pan American Games medalists in baseball
Central American and Caribbean Games gold medalists for Cuba
Competitors at the 2006 Central American and Caribbean Games
Central American and Caribbean Games medalists in baseball
Medalists at the 1999 Pan American Games
Medalists at the 2003 Pan American Games
Medalists at the 2007 Pan American Games
Medalists at the 2011 Pan American Games